The 1975 World Series of Poker (WSOP) was a series of poker tournaments held in May 1975 at Binion's Horseshoe.

Preliminary events

Main Event

There were 21 entrants to the main event. Each paid $10K to enter the winner-take-all tournament.

Final table

Notes

External links
Official site

World Series of Poker
World Series of Poker